Matthieu Jeannès (born 14 November 1987) is a French professional racing cyclist, who currently rides for UCI Continental team . He rode in the men's team time trial at the 2015 UCI Road World Championships.

Major results
2015
 10th The Reading 120
2017
 7th Overall Tour of Rwanda

References

External links

1987 births
Living people
French male cyclists